Sandpipers are a group of birds.

Sandpiper may also refer to:

Music
 The Sandpipers, a singing group of the 1960s and '70s
 The Sandpipers (album), a 1967 album by this group

Other

 Atlantic City Sandpipers, a New Jersey basketball team
 Sandpiper 565, a sailboat design
 The Sandpiper, a 1965 film
 Sandpiper CI, a company based in the (UK) Channel Islands
 Sandpiper mine, a phosphate mine in Namibia
 Sandpipers of Nevada, a Nevada swim team
 Sandpiper pipeline, an underground oil pipeline in the United States
 Sandpiper Trust, a Scottish medical charity
 USS Sandpiper, a name for two U.S. Navy minesweepers